Abdullah Mutlaq Al-Dahmashi Al-Enezi (born 2 May 1990) is a Saudi Arabian football goalkeeper .

Career
At the club level, Abdullah Al-Enezi played for Arar FC.

He is also a member of the Saudi national football team.

Honours

Clubs
Al-Nassr
Saudi Professional League 2013–14 
Saudi Professional League 2014-2015
Saudi Crown Prince Cup: 2013–14
Bani Yas International Tournament: 2011 and 2013
Al  Wehdah International Tournament: 2012

References

1990 births
Living people
Saudi Arabian footballers
Saudi Arabia international footballers
Arar FC players
Al Nassr FC players
2015 AFC Asian Cup players
Sportspeople from Riyadh
Saudi Professional League players
Association football goalkeepers